Club de Deportes Santiago Wanderers is a football club based in Valparaíso, a founding member of the Chilean Football Federation. Their home ground, Estadio Elías Figueroa Brander, is in the north-west of the city. Wanderers have played their games there since 1931 after moving from Barrio Puerto.

Founded on 15 August 1892, it's the country's oldest club and the oldest football team in Latin America as well. There are four clubs older than Wanderers in Peru and Argentina, but none of those started out as football clubs and all of their football branches started after 1892. For this reason, Wanderers is known in Chile as the Decano del fútbol chileno ("The dean of Chilean football") and forms part of Conmebol's Club de los 100, section which congregates Latin-American teams founded over 100 years ago. In 2007, the club was declared as part of Valparaíso's intangible heritage. The club's home colours are green shirts and socks with white shorts, which are based on the colours of the Irish Football Association team.

Wanderers have a fierce rivalry with neighbours Everton and the two sides contest the Clásico Porteño (Seaport Derby), the oldest derby in Chile, which started in 1916. Wanderers are historically the working-class club whereas Everton are considered to be from the richer tourism-orientated areas.

In the club's early history, the club was a member of the local championship held in the Valparaíso Region called Liga Valparaíso, where it won seven titles. In 1926, the football associations in Chile were unified, and Valparaíso went into decline as the administrative centre of the Chilean football. After this period, having joined the professional football association in 1944, the club has won three further league titles in 1958, 1968, and 2001.

Wanderers have produced important players in Chilean football history like Elías Figueroa, who is considered the best Chilean footballer of all time, as well as one of the greatest defenders of football, alongside Franz Beckenbauer, according to FIFA. Other important players that Wanderers has produced for Chile have been David Pizarro and Eugenio Mena, who were both 2015 Copa América champions, the first ever title of the nation in this contest.

History

Beginnings

Santiago Wanderers was officially established on 15 August 1892 in Barrio Puerto at Valparaíso. Because the presence of a team called Valparaíso Wanderers, the name Santiago was adopted by the club founders to distinguish the new team to the already existent.

Until 1936, the club played at an amateur level until officially joining the league competition in 1937 as soon as the Chilean Football Federation began organising championships in the center and the south of Chile since 1933. In their first season at professional league, after finishing in the bottom of the table – seventh place – without points, Wanderers decided to leave the Asociación de Fútbol de Santiago (federation's official entity that organized the professional football tournament; current ANFP) and return to the local football association. However, in 1944, Wanderers definitely joined the professional league and completed regular campaigns during the late 1940s and early 1950s.

1955–2007

Wanderers' first successful era started when José Pérez was made manager in 1955. In 1958, his third season in charge, the club won their first league title and in 1959 its first ever Copa Chile where beat 5–1 win to Deportes La Serena in the final. In 1961, Wanderers again reached the Cup title defeating Universidad Católica in the aggregate. For the remainder of the 1960s, after finishing fifth and eighth the following seasons, in 1968, Wanderers reached its second league title and closed a cycle where saw the emergence of players like Elías Figueroa.

However, the success didn't continue during the 1970s; José Pérez left the club and Wanderers were relegated to second division in 1977, following a permanent internal turmoil at the board and bad campaigns. Nevertheless, the club was promoted at the first attempt after winning the championship, just two points clear of Naval from Talcahuano. Once in top-tier Wanderers didn't highlighted and generally finished on mid-table or the last places.

Wanderers were relegated for the third time in 1984 and did not return until 1989, after beating 4–1 to Unión San Felipe in the promotion playoffs. However, in 1991, Wanderers were relegated again to second division and celebrated its 100th anniversary close to fall to the third division, only five points from relegation. Following four seasons at second-tier, Wanderers finally returned to top level in 1995.

After spending between the second division and the first division between 1997 and 1999, once definitely settled at top-level, in 2001, Wanderers led by Jorge Garcés achieved its third League title following thirty three years without won an honour, after winning 4–2 to Audax Italiano during the tournament's final matchday at Estadio Nacional in Santiago with 50,000 supporters that travelled from Valparaíso.

The ups and downs: 2007–present
Following relative good seasons, in 2007, the club back to Primera B after finishing in the annual table's penultimate place. However two seasons later, the club returned once again to top-tier following a victory in both promotion playoffs legs to San Luis Quillota. After a 2010 season on mid-table, the incoming year the team shook off the relegation against Naval.

In 2014, Wanderers realized an impressive Torneo Clausura finishing runner-up behind giants Universidad de Chile after beating Colo-Colo and advance to the second place. However the club qualified to an international tournament following a twelve-year absence, reaching the 2015 Copa Sudamericana, despite obstreperously losing 6–1 as home with Palestino in the final of the playoffs for qualify to the continental tournament.

In 2017, the club won its third Copa Chile title after beating to Universidad de Chile in the final held in Estadio Ester Roa Rebolledo at Concepción.

Colours

In its early years the color that characterized Wanderers were white with the initials "SW" stamped in black. These uniforms were made manually (often by players' wives), which made lose uniformity, as usually they differed from each other.

In 1907 the team added a black diagonal band in the classic white uniform, although differences remained between the players costumes. It was like that when James McLean, an Englishman who had come to Valparaiso few years earlier, proposed sending uniforms from England, where they already manufactured especially for football teams. In McLean's return, Wanderers received twenty green kits and twenty white shorts, besides a black uniform for the goalkeepers. The explanation of the design change was that McLean, of Irish origin, decided to send kits with the colors of the Irish Football Association team. The first time which Wanderers used that uniform was on 18 September 1908.

Since then the team has maintained its home kit with some exceptions, where it was used a white shirt with thin green stripes in late 60s or in 2001 when Wanderers won its third league title.

In 2007 was released a similar uniform to the used in 1965 and 1966, as a way to honour the 115 years of the institution.

Kit manufacturers & shirt sponsors

Rivalries

Santiago Wanderers' traditional rivals are Everton de Viña del Mar and both teams dispute the Clásico Porteño. Although the first games between both date from 1910s, in that age the rival of Wanderers was La Cruz Football Club from Valparaíso too. The rivalry with Everton began to take shape towards mid-1930s and was intensified with the transfer of that club to Viña del Mar.

During the amateurism Wanderers dominated the record of facings against Everton, but today the club has not been able to reverse that difference in the professional era, which explains the current historical disadvantage (only overcome in the early 1970s). Deepening the last point, both have faced off 156 times, of which 43 have been draws, 64 have been victories for Everton and 49 have been for Wanderers, whilst for top-tier, the greens have won 34 times, Everton won 39 times, having a registered 30 ties.

The first professional match between Wanderers and Everton team took place on 9 July 1944 with a 2–0 win for Vina del Mar's team. Nevertheless, it was in these times where the biggest win for derbies came, with a 17–0 victory for Everton on 30 April 1950.

Stadium

Players

Current squad

2021 Winter transfers

In

Out

Supporters
The club's supporters are known as Porteños or Wanderinos. Wanderers principal fan group are The Panzers, whose politics tend to be left-wing.

Anthem
Based in the rhythm of English march Captain Craddock, the most commonly accepted and widespread version is that this dates back to 1912 and would be work from the performer and composer Efrain Arévalo López, who would have donated the composition in a gesture of thanks to the club's board, for the joys lived with the team.

Managers

  Pedro Mazullo (1935)
  Ramón Opazo (1937)
  Fermín Lecea (1943–45)
  José Pérez (1949–50)
  Francisco Platko (1952)
  Héctor Velasco (1952)
  Carlos Snopek (1954)
  José Pérez (1955–61)
  Sergio Cruzat (1962)
  Donato Hernández (1963)
  Martín García (1964–65)
  Donato Hernández (1966)
  Guillermo Díaz (1967)
  José Pérez (1968)
  Donato Hernández (1969)
  Jorge Luco (1970)
  Luis Álamos (1971)
  Francisco Hormazábal (1972)
  Washington Urrutia (1973)
  Hernán Gárate (1973–74)
  Donato Hernández (1974)
  José Pérez (1975–77)
  Guillermo Díaz (1978–79)
  Donato Hernández (1979)
  Luis Álamos (1979–80)
  Jorge Luco (1980)
  Armando Tobar (1981)
  Jorge Toro (1981)
  Guillermo Díaz (1982)
  Juan Rodríguez Vega (1982)
  Pedro Morales (1983)
  Guillermo Díaz (1984–85)
  Luis Parraguez (1987)
  Hernán Godoy (1988)
  Isaac Carrasco (1989–90)
  Luis Santibáñez (1990)
  Óscar Blanco (1991)
  Hernán Godoy (1991)
  Armando Tobar (1992)
  Isaac Carrasco (1992)
  Elías Figueroa (1993)
  Raúl Aravena (1994)
  Jorge Luis Siviero (1994–97)
  Jorge Socías (1997)
  Leonardo Véliz (1998)
  Pedro García (1998)
  Guillermo Páez (1999)
  Juan Rivero (1999)
  Jorge Garcés (1999–2001)
  Ricardo Dabrowski (2002)
  Yuri Fernández (2003–04)
  Raúl Aravena (2004)
  Carlos González (2005)
  Mario Soto (2005–06)
  Hernán Godoy (2006–07)
  Raúl Aravena (2007)
  Yuri Fernández (2007)
  Héctor Robles (2007)
  Gustavo Huerta (2008)
  Jorge Aravena (2008–09)
  Humberto Zuccarelli (2009–10)
  Jorge Garcés (2010)
  Juan Manuel Llop ( 2011)
  Héctor Robles (2011)
  Arturo Salah (2011–12)
  Héctor Robles (caretaker) (2012)
  Ivo Basay (012−2014)
  Héctor Robles (caretaker) (2014)
  Emiliano Astorga (2014–2015)
  Alfredo Arias (2016)
  Eduardo Espinel (2016–2017)
  Nicolás Córdova (2017–present)

Honours

Amateur era
National Football Association
Winners (1): 1897
Liga de Valparaiso
Winners (10): 1907, 1909, 1913, 1915, 1917, 1919, 1921, 1933, 1934, 1934
Copa Sporting
Winners (1): 1907
Challenge Cup Football Association of Chile
Winners (1): 1899

Professional era
Primera División
Winners (3): 1958, 1968, 2001
Runner-up (4): 1949, 1956, 1960, 2014-A
Copa Chile
Winners (3): 1959, 1961, 2017
Runner-up (2): 1960, 1974
Primera B
Winners (3): 1978, 1995, 2019
Runner-up (2): 1999, 2009
Supercopa de Chile
Runner-up (1): 2018
Campeonato de Apertura
Runner-up (1): 1949
Copa Apertura Segunda División
Runner-up (1): 1986

South American cups history

Records

Seasons and participations 
61 seasons in Primera División 1937, 1944–77, 1979, 1980, 1983, 1984, 1990, 1991, 1996–98, 2000–07, 2010–2017, 2020-
17 seasons in Primera B 1978, 1981, 1982, 1985–89, 1992–95, 1999, 2008–09, 2018–2019
3 Participations in Copa Libertadores 1969, 2002, 2018
3 Participations in Copa Sudamericana 2002, 2004, 2015

Results and players achievements 
 Record Primera División victory: 7–0 v. Everton (1949) & v. Universidad Católica (1954).
 Record Copa Chile victory: 7–2 v. San Luis (2014)
 Record Primera División defeat: 1–7 Audax Italiano (2007)
 Record defeat (overall): 0–17 v. Everton (1950)
 Most goals scored (Primera División matches) — 84, Juan Álvarez
 Most goals scored in a Primera División league  — 30, Mario Véner (1996).
 Highest home attendance  — 30,099 v. Colo-Colo (30 August 1964) (at Estadio Sausalito)
 Primera División Best Position  — Champions (1958, 1968, 2001)
 Copa Chile Best Season  — Champions (1959, 1961, 2017)

See also
 Valparaíso

References

External links

Santiago Wanderers Website

 
Football clubs in Chile
Association football clubs established in 1892
Sport in Valparaíso Region
1892 establishments in Chile